De pata negra is the first studio album by Spanish singer Melody. It was released in Spain two weeks after the single "El baile del gorila". The album sold more than 600,000 copies worldwide.

Track listing
 El baile del gorila 3:11 
 Mi mejor amiga 3:05 
 De pata negra 2:46 
 Papi, ¿qué me pasa a mí? 3:34 
 La ratita 3:50 
 Besos de cristal 3:20 
 La cuerda de su guitarra 3:11 
 Juego a ser mayor 2:54 
 Señora sociedad 5:07 
 Como canta la gallina 2:48 
 La calculadora antero, 3:22 
 Mío, mío 2:33

Charts

Weekly charts

Year-end charts

Certifications

Accolades 

|-
| style="text-align:center;"|2002
| 3rd Latin Grammy Awards
| Best Children's Album
|
|-
|style="text-align:center;"| 2003
| 2003 Latin Billboard Music Awards
| Latin Pop Album of the Year, New Artist
|
|-

References

External links

[ Melody] at AllMusic

2001 debut albums
Melody (Spanish singer) albums